Volnovakha is a town in Ukraine. It served as the administrative center of Volnovakha Raion, one of the 18 districts of the Donetsk Oblast.

The train station is a railway hub, and serves the only onshore rail line between Russia and Crimea, also connecting to Mariupol.

During the invasion, much of the town's infrastructure was severely damaged, with some reports describing the town as devastated. On 12 March 2022, Governor of Donetsk Oblast Pavlo Kyrylenko stated that the town had been completely destroyed.

History

World War 2
During World War II, the Soviet Union reported significant fighting in the area around Volnovka during August and September 1943. Several units were given honorary titles after the battle in town.

Russo–Ukrainian War 

During the War in Donbas, on 13 January 2015, 12 civilians were killed and 18 injured, after an attack on a passenger bus at a checkpoint in Buhas, a town north-east of Volnovakha. A monument to those killed in the attack was unveiled on 13 January 2017.

During the 2022 Russian invasion of Ukraine, Russian forces engaged in indiscriminate bombing of Volnovakha and Shchastia, shelling civilian areas. The terror bombing of the cities violated international law and echoed tactics Russia had previously used on civilian targets in Syria. Volnovakha was reported to be on the verge of humanitarian crisis on February 28, and almost destroyed by March 1, with around 90% of its buildings either damaged or destroyed. Surviving residents were cut off from food, water, and electricity. Following the assault, bodies lay uncollected in the streets.

On 11 March, Russia claimed that forces of the Donetsk People's Republic had captured Volnovakha.

On 12 March, Pavlo Kyrylenko, the governor of Donetsk Oblast, stated that the town had been completely destroyed and effectively ceased to exist, but fighting continued there to prevent a Russian encirclement. Euronews reported that much of it had been destroyed in the fighting.

Demographics 
The town had 24,647 inhabitants in 2001. The town had a large Ukrainian Greek population. 52.9% of the population are ethnic Ukrainians, Russians constitute 24.2% of the population, 20% are Greeks and 0.7% are Belarusian.

Climate

Gallery

References

External links 

 Site of town
 Official site of Volnovaha raiderzhadministration
 Official site of Volnovaha town Council

Cities in Donetsk Oblast
Cities of district significance in Ukraine
Populated places established in the Russian Empire
Yekaterinoslav Governorate
Destroyed cities
Volnovakha Raion